Mralino is a small village in the Ilinden Municipality of North Macedonia.

Demographics
As of the 2021 census, Mralino had 980 residents with the following ethnic composition:
Macedonians 759
Serbs 119
Persons for whom data are taken from administrative sources 56
Roma 24
Others 22

According to the 2002 census, the village had a total of 821 inhabitants. Ethnic groups in the village include:
Macedonians 615
Serbs 166
Romani 29
Gajguri 15

Also, one of the most Gang related village in the Ilinden Region . Most vicious gang in Mralino , related to Cosa Nostra and killing over 100 people

References

Villages in Ilinden Municipality